The 2015 Shakey's V-League (SVL) season was the twelfth season of the Shakey's V-League (SVL). There were three indoor conferences in the season.

Open Conference

Tournament Format

Preliminaries (PL)
Single Round-robin. Top four teams qualify for the Semifinals.

Semi-finals (SF)
The four semi-finalists will compete against each other in a single-round robin phase.
 Top two SF teams will compete for GOLD.
 Bottom two SF teams will compete for BRONZE.

Finals
The battle for GOLD and the battle for BRONZE will both follow the best-of-three format.
 If the battle for GOLD ends in two matches (2-0), then there will no longer be a Game 3 for either GOLD or Bronze. A tie in the contest for the BRONZE (1-1) will be resolved using FIVB rules.
 A tie in the series for GOLD (1-1) after Game 2 will be broken by a Game 3, regardless of the result of the series in BRONZE.

Participating teams

Preliminaries

|}

 

|}

Semifinals

|}

|}

Finals

Battle for Bronze

Battle for Gold

Final standings

Individual Awards

Collegiate Conference

Tournament Format

Preliminaries (PL)
 Twelve (12) participating teams will be divided into two PL groups - Group A & Group B.
 Each pool will play a single round robin.
 The TOP 4 TEAMS PER POOL (or a total of eight teams) will advance to the Quarterfinal Round.
 The bottom two per group will be eliminated from the tournament.

Quarterfinals (QF)
 The eight quarter finalists will be regrouped into one pool.
 The top four teams after a single round robin will advance to the semi-finals round.

Semi-finals (SF)
 The four semi-finalists will compete against each other in a best-of-three series as follows: Rank 1 vs Rank 4 and Rank 2 vs Rank 3.
 Top two SF teams will compete for GOLD.
 Bottom two SF teams will compete for BRONZE.

Finals
The battle for GOLD and the battle for BRONZE will both follow the best-of-three format, provided:
 If the battle for GOLD ends in two matches (2-0), then there will no longer be a Game 3 for either GOLD or Bronze. A tie in BRONZE (1-1) will be resolve using FIVB rules.
 A tie in the series for GOLD (1-1) after Game 2 will be broken in a Game 3, regardless of the result of the series in BRONZE.

Participating teams

Preliminaries

Group A

|}

Match Results

|}

Group B

|}

Match Results

|}

Quarterfinals

|}

Match Results

|}

Semifinals
 Ranking is based from the quarter finals round.
 All series are best-of-3

Rank 1 vs Rank 4

|}
 Ateneo de Manila University advances to the final round.

Rank 2 vs Rank 3

|}
 National University advances to the final round.
 Far Eastern University & University of Santo Tomas will compete for the 3rd place (BRONZE).

Finals

Battle for Bronze

Battle for Gold

Awards

Most Valuable Player (Finals)
  Myla Pablo
Most Valuable Player (Conference)
  Alyssa Valdez
 Best Setter
  Gizelle Tan
Best  Outside Spikers
  Alyssa Valdez
  Ennajie Laure

Best Middle Blockers
  Alyja Daphne Santiago
  Bea De Leon
Best Opposite Spiker
  Jovelyn Gonzaga
Best Libero
  Fatima Bia General

Final standings

Note: 
(G) - Guest Player
((c)) - Team Captain
(L) - Libero

Reinforced Open Conference

Tournament Format

Preliminaries (PL)
Teams will play a single round robin format.
 The TOP 4 TEAMS will advance to the semi-finals (SF) round.
 The bottom two teams will be eliminated from the tournament.

Semi-finals (SF)
The top four teams at the end of the single-round eliminations will advance to semifinals, with the top two earning a twice-to-beat advantage.
 Semi-finals series: Rank 1 vs Rank 4 and Rank 2 vs Rank 3
 Top two SF teams will compete for GOLD.
 Bottom two SF teams will compete for BRONZE.

Finals
The battle for GOLD and the battle for BRONZE will both follow the best-of-three format, provided:
 If the battle for GOLD ends in two matches (2-0), then there will no longer be a Game 3 for either GOLD or Bronze. A tie in BRONZE (1-1) will be resolve using FIVB rules.
 A tie in the series for GOLD (1-1) after Game 2 will be broken in a Game 3, regardless of the result of the series in BRONZE.

Participating teams

Preliminary round

|}

Match Results

|}

Semifinals Round
 Ranking is based from the preliminary round.

Rank 1 vs Rank 4
 Philippine Army Lady Troopers (Rank #1) had the twice-to-beat advantage

|}

Rank 2 vs Rank 3
 PLDT Home Ultera (Rank #2) had the twice-to-beat advantage

|}

Finals

Battle for Bronze

Battle for Gold

Final standings

 Note: 
 ((c)) – Team Captain
 (L) – Libero

Awards

Most Valuable Player (Finals)
 Alyssa Valdez ( PLDT)
Most Valuable Player (Conference)
 Jovelyn Gonzaga ( Army)
Best Setter
 Janet Serafica ( Navy)
Best  Outside Spikers
 Honey Royse Tubino ( Army)
 Janine Marciano ( PLDT)

Best Middle Blockers
 Kathy Bersola ( UP)
 Sheena Mae Chopitea ( UP)
Best Opposite Spiker
 Jovelyn Gonzaga ( Army)
Best Libero
 Lizlee Ann Gata-Pantone ( PLDT)

Broadcast partners
 GMA News TV (local)
 GMA Life TV (international)

References

Shakey's V-League seasons
2015 in Philippine sport